The Death of an Insect is a 2010 short Finnish experimental film directed by Hannes Vartiainen and Pekka Veikkolainen. The film was created using real insects and uses a variety of animation techniques, including stop-motion and 3D models. The film contains no dialogue.

References

External links
 

2010 animated films
2010 films
2010 3D films
2010 short films
2010s avant-garde and experimental films
Finnish animated films
Finnish avant-garde and experimental films
2010s Finnish-language films
Films about insects
Animated films without speech
Stop-motion animated short films
3D animated short films